The Cleveland Lumberjacks were an International Hockey League (IHL) team based in Cleveland, Ohio.

Facts
Owner: Larry Gordon
Logo design: "Buzz"- A beaver wearing overalls holding a homemade hockey stick framed by a circular saw blade
Division titles won: none
Regular season titles won: none
League championships won: none
Mascot: Buzz
Local media: WUAB (1992–94), WBNX (1994–95), WKNR (1995-2001)

History
Originally formed in 1960 in Muskegon, Michigan as the Muskegon Zephyrs, the team was renamed the Mohawks in 1965 and the Lumberjacks in 1984.  It moved to Cleveland in 1992 as part of the IHL's move upmarket, bringing professional hockey back to Cleveland for the first time in 14 years. It later folded along with the IHL at the end of the 2000–01 season.

In the 1995 hockey action movie Sudden Death starring Jean-Claude van Damme, Lumberjacks players impersonated the Chicago Blackhawks.

Market previously served by: Cleveland Barons of the NHL (1976–78)
Franchise replaced by: Cleveland Barons of the AHL (2001–06)

On December 16, 2011, before a Lake Erie Monsters game former Lumberjack Jock Callander  had his number 15 retired in honor of his career as a member of the Lumberjacks, as well as his involvement in hockey initiatives in the Cleveland area.

Season-by-season record
Note: GP = Games played, W = Wins, L = Losses, T = Ties, OTL = Overtime losses/Shootout losses, Pts = Points, GF = Goals for, GA = Goals against, PIM = Penalties in minutes

Playoffs

Team records
Goals: 48 Tom Rodgers (1993–94)
Assists: 70 Jock Callander (1993–94)
Points: 112 Dave Michayluk (1992–93)
Points, Defenseman: 68 Dale DeGray (1994–95)
Penalty Minutes: 427 Paul Laus (1992–93)
Wins: 26 Rob Dopson (1992–93)
Shutouts: 6 Zac Bierk (2000–01)
GAA: 2.68 Evgeni Nabokov (1999–2000)
SV%: .920 Evgeni Nabokov (1999–2000)
Career Goals: 181 Jock Callander
Career Assists: 279 Jock Callander
Career Points: 460 Jock Callander
Career Penalty Minutes: 948 Rick Hayward
Career Goaltending Wins: 43 Philippe DeRouville
Career Shutouts: 6 Zac Bierk
Career Games: 501 Jock Callander

References

External links
Cleveland Lumberjacks at The Internet Hockey Database

Defunct ice hockey teams in Ohio
International Hockey League (1945–2001) teams
Chicago Blackhawks minor league affiliates
Minnesota Wild minor league affiliates
Pittsburgh Penguins minor league affiliates
Tampa Bay Lightning minor league affiliates
Lumberjacks
Ice hockey clubs established in 1992
Ice hockey clubs disestablished in 2001
1992 establishments in Ohio
2001 disestablishments in Ohio